Weis may refer to:
Weis (surname), including a list of people with the name
 Weis, an Australian frozen dessert brand
 Weis Markets, supermarket chain
 WEIS (AM), a radio station (990 AM) licensed to Centre, Alabama, USA
 Weis Manufacturing Company, a NRHP in Monroe, Michigan
 Weis, the middle frog in the Budweiser Frogs advertising campaign

See also
 Weise
 Weiss (disambiguation)
 Weisse
 Weisz
 Wise (disambiguation)
 WAIS (disambiguation)